

Champions

Major League Baseball
World Series: Baltimore Orioles over Philadelphia Phillies (4-1); Rick Dempsey, MVP

American League Championship Series MVP: Mike Boddicker
National League Championship Series MVP: Gary Matthews
All-Star Game, July 6 at Comiskey Park: American League, 13-3; Fred Lynn, MVP

Other champions
Caribbean World Series: Lobos de Arecibo (Puerto Rico)
College World Series: Texas
Japan Series: Seibu Lions over Yomiuri Giants (4-3)
Korean Series: Haitai Tigers over MBC Chungyong
Big League World Series: Taipei, Taiwan
Junior League World Series: Manatí, Puerto Rico
Little League World Series: East Marietta National, Marietta, Georgia
Senior League World Series: Pingtung, Taiwan
Pan American Games: Cuba over Nicaragua

Awards and honors
Baseball Hall of Fame
Walter Alston
George Kell
Juan Marichal
Brooks Robinson
Most Valuable Player
Cal Ripken Jr., Baltimore Orioles, SS (AL)
Dale Murphy, Atlanta Braves, OF (NL)
Cy Young Award
LaMarr Hoyt, Chicago White Sox (AL)
John Denny, Philadelphia Phillies (NL)
Rookie of the Year
Ron Kittle, Chicago White Sox, OF (AL)
Darryl Strawberry, New York Mets, OF (NL)
Manager of the Year Award
Tony La Russa, Chicago White Sox (AL)
Tommy Lasorda, Los Angeles Dodgers (NL)
Woman Executive of the Year (major or minor league): Karen Paul, El Paso Diablos, Texas League
Gold Glove Award
Eddie Murray (1B) (AL) 
Lou Whitaker (2B) (AL) 
Buddy Bell (3B) (AL) 
Alan Trammell (SS) (AL) 
Dwight Evans (OF) (AL) 
Dave Winfield (OF) (AL) 
Dwayne Murphy (OF) (AL)
Lance Parrish (C) (AL) 
Ron Guidry (P) (AL)

MLB statistical leaders

Major league baseball final standings

Events

January
January 10 – New York Supreme Court Justice Richard Lane issues a preliminary injunction barring the Yankees from playing their season-opening series with the Detroit Tigers in Denver. The club had sought to move the games because it feared off-season renovations to Yankee Stadium would not be completed for the series April 11–13.
January 11 – For the third time in eight years, New York Yankees owner George Steinbrenner hired Billy Martin as manager. Martin replaces Clyde King who will move to the front office.
January 12 – Brooks Robinson and Juan Marichal are elected to the Hall of Fame by the Baseball Writers' Association of America. Robinson becomes the 14th player to be elected in his first year of eligibility.
January 19 – The Los Angeles Dodgers trade Ron Cey to the Chicago Cubs for two minor leaguers, leaving Bill Russell as the last remaining member of an infield tandem that had been together since 1974.  Russell would remain with the Dodgers until retiring after the 1986 season.

February
February 5 – The Kansas City Royals traded minor league prospect Cecil Fielder to the Toronto Blue Jays for 32-year old outfielder Leon Roberts, who will retire after two mediocre seasons in Kansas City. "Big Daddy" will go on to enjoy several MVP like caliber seasons during his 13-year tenure in the Major Leagues, having his best years playing with The Detroit Tigers.

March–April
April 5 – Tom Seaver pitches six scoreless innings in his return to the New York Mets in front of 46,687 fans at Shea Stadium. He does not, however, factor in the decision, as he is matched by Philadelphia Phillies ace Steve Carlton until the Mets break through for two runs in the seventh to make Doug Sisk the winner of their season opener.
April 7 – Major League Baseball, ABC, and NBC agree to terms of a six-year television package worth $1.2 billion. The two networks will continue alternative coverage of the All-Star Game, the playoffs and the World Series through the 1989 season with each of the 26 clubs receiving $7 million per year in return. The last package gave each club $1.9 billion per year.
April 13 – Philadelphia Phillies catcher Bo Díaz accomplishes something that only 11 other Major League players have in the 150-plus year history of the sport: a "Sayonara Slam" (a walk off Grand Slam in the bottom of the ninth inning with two outs and his team trailing by three runs). With the New York Mets leading the Phillies, 9–6, and the Phillies down to their last out, Díaz drives a 2-1 Neil Allen pitch out of Veterans Stadium to win the game for the Phillies, 10–9.
April 15 
 Against the Chicago White Sox at Comiskey Park, Milt Wilcox of the Detroit Tigers has his bid for a perfect game broken up with two out in the ninth by a Jerry Hairston single. The hit is the only one Wilcox allows in defeating the White Sox 6-0. The perfect game would also have made the White Sox and Tigers the first teams to record perfect games against each other; the Tigers were on the losing end of Charlie Robertson's perfect game on April 30, .
 Steve Garvey came back to Dodger Stadium as a Padre and earned lots of cheers before 53,392 fans as he tied Billy Williams N.L. record for most consecutive games played with his 1,117th consecutive game. 
April 16 - Padres first baseman Steve Garvey played in his 1,118th consecutive game, breaking Billy Williams N.L record. Garvey goes 2 for 4 in the Padres 8-5 loss to the Los Angeles Dodgers.
April 17 – Nolan Ryan fans seven Expos in a 6-3 Houston win. Ryan became the second pitcher with 3,500 strikeouts.
April 27 – Nolan Ryan strikes out Brad Mills of the Montréal Expos. It is the 3,509th strikeout of Ryan's career, breaking the long time record established by Walter Johnson.

May-June
May 1 – Robin Yount hits his 100th career home run.
May 2 – José Oquendo makes his major league debut with the New York Mets. Having been born on July 4, he is the first player in franchise history to be younger than the franchise (which began play in ).
May 6 – New York Mets prospect Darryl Strawberry goes 0 for four with three strikeouts in his Major league debut.
May 29 – Dodgers reliever Steve Howe checks himself into drug rehabilitation for cocaine addiction.  The Dodgers fine him $54,000.  He would return in June and commissioner Bowie Kuhn placed him on 3 years probation.
June 15 – The New York Mets acquire first baseman Keith Hernandez from the St. Louis Cardinals for pitchers Neil Allen and Rick Ownbey.
June 24 – Don Sutton of the Milwaukee Brewers records his 3,000th career strikeout.

July–September
July 4 – Left-handed pitcher Dave Righetti throws the Yankees' first no-hitter since Don Larsen's perfect game in the 1956 World Series, handcuffing the Boston Red Sox 4–0 before a holiday crowd of 41,077 at Yankee Stadium. It is the first no-hitter by a Yankee left-handed pitcher since George Mogridge in 1917.
July 6 – In the 50th anniversary All-Star Game at Chicago's Comiskey Park, the American League routs the National League 13–3 for its first win since 1971. The AL breaks the game open with seven runs in the 4th inning, highlighted by Fred Lynn's grand slam — the first ever in an All-Star competition. It is Lynn's 4th All-Star homer, tying him with Ted Williams for the AL record.
July 18 – Philadelphia Phillies' general manager Paul Owens fires manager Pat Corrales (even though his team is in first place) and takes over as manager himself.
July 24 – In the game now known as the Pine Tar Game, George Brett hits an apparent go-ahead 2-run home run off of Goose Gossage in the ninth inning of a game against the New York Yankees at Yankee Stadium. After being called out and having the home run nullified, Brett goes ballistic and charges out of the dugout after McClelland. The AL president's office later upholds the Kansas City Royals protest, restoring the home run, and the game is completed on August 18, with the Royals winning 5-4.
July 29 – Steve Garvey, first baseman for the San Diego Padres dislocates his thumb, and ends his streak of 1,207 consecutive games played. It is still the National League record for consecutive games played.
August 6 – Kansas City Royals starter Eric Rasmussen tosses a 4-0 shutout against the Boston Red Sox in his first ever start in the American League. Having already shut out the San Diego Padres in his major league debut for the St. Louis Cardinals on July 21, Rasmussen becomes the only major league pitcher to ever pitch a shutout in his first National League start and his first American League start.
August 24 – Against the Cincinnati Reds at Wrigley Field, Chuck Rainey of the Chicago Cubs has a no-hitter broken up with two out in the ninth on an Eddie Milner single. The hit is the only one Rainey allows in defeating the Reds 3-0.
September 13 – Dan Quisenberry the famed Kansas City Royals relief pitcher breaks John Hiller for most saves in a season with his 39th save. The submariner pitcher record the final two outs in a 4-3 victory over The California Angels.
September 17 – The Chicago White Sox defeat the Seattle Mariners 4-3 at old Comiskey Park, clinching their first division title. It secures their first post season berth since , and the last the team has at old Comiskey.
September 19 – Steve Howe misses a Dodgers' team flight to Atlanta and refuses a drug test. Commissioner Bowie Kuhn convenes an investigation and it is revealed that Howe was being treated by a doctor but not in drug rehab. Howe sits out the remainder of the season.
September 20 – In the first inning of a 14-1 rain-shortened five-inning victory over The Baltimore Orioles. The Detroit Tigers stroke 10 consecutive hits on 11 runs.
September 23 – Steve Carlton of the Philadelphia Phillies records his 300th career win;  a 6-2 defeat of the St. Louis Cardinals at old Busch Stadium.
September 26 – Bob Forsch of the St. Louis Cardinals no-hits the Montreal Expos 3-0 at Busch Memorial Stadium.
September 28 – The Philadelphia Phillies clinch the National League East championship with the 7,000th win in their history, 13-6, over the Chicago Cubs.
September 29 – Rookie Mike Warren of the Oakland Athletics no-hits the Chicago White Sox 3-0 at Oakland–Alameda County Coliseum.

October
October 1 – Carl Yastrzemski played his last MLB game at Fenway Park. During his farewell appearance, he lapped the entire field to say thanks to his illustrious 23-year career all with The Red Sox.
October 2 – Inspired by the outpouring of tributes lavished on retiring Boston Red Sox star Carl Yastrzemski, the producers of Boston phone-in radio show The Sports Huddle on  radio station WHDH, decide to do a satirical tribute to Vern Rapp, who also plans to retire at the end of the season after five years as first-base coach of the Montreal Expos (-1983). On the last day of the regular season, they proceeded with their tongue in cheek tribute to Rapp, including a mock telethon in which phone callers were invited to pledge money to Rapp's retirement fund (a substantial sum was actually pledged, though no money was collected), and a song to the tune of Bye Bye Birdie ("Bye Bye Vern Rapp"). The program turned out to be anything but a spoof, though. St. Louis Cardinals broadcaster Mike Shannon spoke admiringly of the man, and Rapp, reached by telephone in Montreal, was choked up by the whole affair. WHDH also conducted a telephone interview with Sheldon Bender, vice-president of player personnel for the Cincinnati Reds. Until the station called, Bender was unaware that Rapp was leaving the Expos. Bender suggested Rapp at a meeting the next day at which the Reds' bosses were discussing whether to fire Manager Russ Nixon. One thing led to another, and Rapp received a surprise phone call from Bob Howsam, who had returned from his own retirement to try to arrest the declining fortunes of the Reds. Rapp decided that becoming the Reds' skipper was worth unretiring for, and accepted the job on October 5. WHDH sent Rapp the cassette recording of what turned out to be a most momentous broadcast. Bender admitted "Vern wasn't a candidate for the job until the station called."
October 6 – In the second game of the American League Championship Series, Oriole hurler Mike Boddicker throws a five-hitter and beat The Chicago White Sox at Memorial Stadium, 4-0. The Baltimore right hander, whose performance even the series, establishes a new LCS record by striking out 14 batters.
October 8 – In front of 64,494 fans at Veterans Stadium, The Phillies win the NLCS behind the pitching of Steve Carlton and the power of Gary Matthews 3-run homer 7-2. The Phillies made the World Series for only the fourth time in franchise history (1915, 1950, 1980 and now 1983)
October 16 – Eddie Murray slams a pair of home runs and Scott McGregor pitches a five-hitter as the Baltimore Orioles beat the Philadelphia Phillies 5–0 and win the 1983 World Series in Game Five. Baltimore catcher Rick Dempsey, who hits .385 with four doubles and a home run, is the Series MVP.
October 30 – Boston Red Sox farmhands John Mitchell, Anthony Latham and Scott Skripko, are deep-sea fishing off the coast of Florida when their boat capsizes. Boat owner Mark Zastrowmy and Latham drown. Skripko and Mitchell survive over 20 hours in the water by clinging to debris; Skripko holds onto a cooler for 20 hours and Mitchell a bucket for 22 hours.

November-December
November 2 – John Denny who tallied 20 of the 24 writers' first-place votes to win The National League Cy Young Award, easily out-distancing runners-up Mario Soto and Jessie Orosco. The Prescott, Arizona native posted a 19-6 record and a 2.37 ERA for The National League Champion Phillies.
November 8:
Mets reliever Jessie Orosco received four votes for the National League Most Valuable Player Award, ending a six-year drought in which not one player on the team received a single vote for the award. The last time a writer cast an MVP vote for a New York National Leaguer was on the 1976 ballot when Tom Seaver was given consideration.
Dale Murphy (.302, 36 homers and 121 RBIs) joins Ernie Banks, Joe Morgan and Mike Schmidt as one of the four players to wim the National League MVP in consecutive years. The soft-spoken Atlanta Braves outfielder receives 21 of the 24 votes cast by the writers.
November 16 – Cal Ripken Jr. of the World Champions of 1983 Baltimore Orioles was named American League MVP. He got 322 votes to earn that award.
November 17 – Three current Kansas City Royals players (Willie Wilson, Willie Aikens, Jerry Martin) and former Royal Vida Blue are convicted of attempting to purchase cocaine, and sentence to short prison terms. It is a foreshadowing of the coming drug scandal that rocks the sport throughout the 1980s.
November 21 – Darryl Strawberry of the New York Mets was named the National League Rookie of the Year award. That season he hit 26 home runs, stole 19 bases and had 74 RBIs while hitting .257.
November 22:
Ron Kittle of the Chicago White Sox, who hits 35 home runs with 100 RBIs, wins the American League Rookie of the Year Award beating out Cleveland infielder Julio Franco and Baltimore pitcher Mike Boddicker.
The MLB Players Association dismisses their executive director Kenneth Moffett and chooses Donald Fehr as his successor.
December 16:
Commissioner Bowie Kuhn announces a one-year suspension from Major League Baseball for Steve Howe of the Dodgers and Willie Wilson, Willie Aikens, Vida Blue, and Jerry Martin of the Kansas City Royals for illegal purchase and use of cocaine.
Billy Martin is fired as New York Yankees manager after a 91-71 record and second-place finish to the Orioles, but George Steinbrenner keeps him under contract as a Yankee scout. Yogi Berra is hired as Martin's replacement.

Movies
Tiger Town (TV)

Births

January
January 2 – J. D. Martin
January 7 – Edwin Encarnación
January 9 – Brandon Boggs
January 9 – Freddy Dolsi
January 13 – Andrew Sisco
January 16 – Eider Torres
January 20 – Matt Albers
January 20 – Geovany Soto
January 22 – José Valdez
January 26 – Ryan Rowland-Smith
January 27 – Gavin Floyd
January 27 – Mike Zagurski
January 28 – Elizardo Ramírez

February
February 1 – Dane De La Rosa
February 2 – Ronny Cedeño
February 2 – Jason Vargas
February 4 – William Bergolla
February 7 – Scott Feldman
February 8 – Burke Badenhop
February 8 – Chase Wright
February 8 – Mauro Zárate
February 13 – Mike Nickeas
February 14 – Callix Crabbe
February 15 – Russell Martin
February 16 – Ramón Troncoso
February 19 – Brad Kilby
February 20 – José Morales
February 20 – Justin Verlander
February 21 – Franklin Gutiérrez
February 22 – Brian Duensing
February 22 – Carlos Fisher
February 22 – Casey Kotchman
February 22 – Arturo López
February 22 – Daniel Nava
February 23 – Édgar González
February 25 – Jay Marshall
February 26 – Joe Martinez
February 26 – José Reyes
February 26 – Francisco Rodríguez
February 28 – Tug Hulett
February 28 – Jeff Niemann
February 28 – Trent Oeltjen

March
March 1 – Blake Hawksworth
March 2 – Glen Perkins
March 3 – Brent Dlugach
March 4 – Sergio Romo
March 7 – Drew Macias
March 7 – Taylor Tankersley
March 8 – Chris Lambert
March 8 – Mark Worrell
March 9 – Willy Aybar
March 10 – Donnie Murphy
March 10 – Steven Shell
March 16 – Stephen Drew
March 16 – Brandon League
March 16 – Rusty Ryal
March 18 – Andy Sonnanstine
March 18 – Craig Tatum
March 22 – Eric Rasmussen
March 24 – Chad Gaudin
March 24 – Devon Lowery
March 26 – Eric Hacker
March 30 – Davis Romero
March 31 – Jeff Mathis

April
April 1 – John Axford
April 1 – Will Rhymes
April 6 – Thomas Diamond
April 6 – Bronson Sardinha
April 7 – Wes Whisler
April 8 – Chris Iannetta
April 8 – Eric Patterson
April 8 – Bobby Wilson
April 11 – Zack Segovia
April 13 – Steven Pearce
April 13 – Hunter Pence
April 14 – Jeff Fiorentino
April 14 – Adam Russell
April 16 – Tommy Manzella
April 18 – Miguel Cabrera
April 18 – Alberto González
April 18 – Mike Parisi
April 19 – Alberto Callaspo
April 19 – Zach Duke
April 19 – Joe Mauer
April 19 – Curtis Thigpen
April 20 – Tommy Everidge
April 23 – Fernando Pérez
April 24 – Daniel Barone
April 25 – J. P. Howell
April 25 – Juan Miranda
April 25 – Garrett Mock
April 28 – David Freese

May
May 4 – John Tumpane
May 10 – George Kottaras
May 12 – Jack Egbert
May 12 – Blake Lalli
May 12 – Evan Meek
May 13 – Zach Jackson
May 13 – Clay Timpner
May 15 – Clint Sammons
May 16 – George Kottaras
May 16 – Steven Register
May 17 - Nobuhiro Matsuda
May 17 – Jeremy Sowers
May 20 – Adam Rosales
May 21 – Kan Otake
May 25 – Adam Hamari
May 28 – Humberto Sánchez
May 28 – Cory Wade
May 30 – Jairo Asencio
May 30 – Jae Kuk Ryu

June
June 2 – Josh Geer
June 4 – Cla Meredith
June 5 – Bill Bray
June 6 – Irving Falu
June 7 – Mark Lowe
June 7 – Doug Mathis
June 9 – Danny Richar
June 10 – Matt Chico
June 10 – Radhames Liz
June 11 – José Reyes
June 17 – David Pauley
June 18 – Jarrett Hoffpauir
June 20 – Kendrys Morales
June 27 – Jim Johnson
June 29 – Pedro Viola
June 29 – Mike Wilson
June 30 – Drew Sutton

July
July 2 – Samuel Deduno
July 3 – Edinson Vólquez
July 4 – Sergio Santos
July 5 – Marco Estrada
July 7 – Brandon McCarthy
July 7 – Luke Montz
July 7 – R. J. Swindle
July 8 – John Bowker
July 9 – Robert Manuel
July 9 – Miguel Montero
July 11 – Zach Clark
July 12 – Howie Kendrick
July 12 – Tony Sipp
July 14 – Juan Gutiérrez
July 17 – Steve Delabar
July 17 – Adam Lind
July 19 – Tim Dillard
July 19 – Wilton López
July 24 – Guilder Rodríguez
July 31 – René Rivera

August
August 2 – Huston Street
August 3 – Mark Reynolds
August 9 – Drew Butera
August 13 – Dallas Braden
August 14 – Juan Carlos Oviedo
August 17 – Tuffy Gosewisch
August 17 – Tyler Greene
August 17 – Dustin Pedroia
August 20 – Lance Broadway
August 21 – Jesse Chavez
August 21 – Jeff Clement
August 24 – Brett Gardner
August 24 – Alan Johnson
August 27 – Billy Buckner
August 29 – Anthony Recker
August 30 – Mike Ekstrom
August 30 – Chris Getz
August 31 – Armando Gabino

September
September 1 – José Constanza
September 2 – Gaby Sánchez
September 3 – Matt Capps
September 5 – Jeff Stevens
September 5 – Chris Young
September 6 – Jerry Blevins
September 8 – Nick Hundley
September 9 – Mike Costanzo
September 9 – Kyle Davies
September 9 – Rhyne Hughes
September 9 – Edwin Jackson
September 9 – Alex Romero
September 10 – Lance Pendleton
September 10 – Joey Votto
September 11 – Jacoby Ellsbury
September 12 – Clayton Richard
September 13 – Andy LaRoche
September 14 – John Hester
September 15 – Luke Hochevar
September 16 – Brandon Moss
September 18 – Brent Lillibridge
September 19 – Joey Devine
September 19 – Robinzon Díaz
September 19 – Charlie Haeger
September 19 – John Jaso
September 20 – Ángel Sánchez
September 24 – Travis Ishikawa
September 25 – Miguel Pérez
September 26 – Scott Lewis
September 28 – Jay Buente

October
October 4 – Kurt Suzuki
October 5 – Alexi Ogando
October 5 – Felipe Paulino
October 6 – Radhames Liz
October 7 – Ryan Rohlinger
October 8 – Antoan Richardson
October 9 – Jason Pridie
October 12 – Nolan Reimold
October 13 – Chris Seddon
October 14 – Alberto Arias
October 17 – Mitch Talbot
October 18 – Garrett Olson
October 21 – Casey Fien
October 21 – Zack Greinke
October 21 – Andy Marte
October 24 – Chris Colabello
October 26 – Francisco Liriano
October 27 – Brent Clevlen
October 27 – Martín Prado
October 28 – Esmailin Caridad
October 29 – Dana Eveland
October 31 – Luis Mendoza

November
November 1 – Steve Tolleson
November 5 – Juan Morillo
November 6 – Justin Maxwell
November 7 – Esmerling Vásquez
November 8 – Chihiro Kaneko
November 9 – Tony Barnette
November 10 – Brian Dinkelman
November 10 – Ryan Mattheus
November 12 – Charlie Morton
November 14 – Guillermo Moscoso
November 14 – Clete Thomas
November 15 – Craig Hansen
November 17 – Ryan Braun
November 17 – Trevor Crowe
November 17 – Nick Markakis
November 17 – Scott Moore
November 18 – Travis Buck
November 20 – Brock Peterson
November 23 – Wes Bankston
November 24 – José López
November 26 – Matt Garza
November 27 – Jason Berken
November 28 – Carlos Villanueva
November 29 – Craig Gentry

December
December 10 – Brandon Jones
December 12 – Gregor Blanco
December 16 – Tom Wilhelmsen
December 18 – Jordan Brown
December 21 – John Mayberry Jr.
December 21 – Taylor Teagarden
December 22 – Blake Davis
December 22 – Greg Smith
December 23 – Hanley Ramírez
December 24 – Gregor Blanco
December 26 – Yohan Pino
December 27 – Cole Hamels

Deaths

January
January 8 – Dave Barnhill, 69, five-time All-Star pitcher who appeared for New York Cubans of the Negro National League between 1941 and 1948.
January 9 – Eddie Palmer, 89, third baseman and pinch hitter in 16 games for the 1917 Philadelphia Athletics.
January 9 – Stan Spence, 67, four-time All-Star outfielder who played for the Boston Red Sox, Washington Senators and St. Louis Browns for nine seasons between 1940 and 1949.
January 10 – Gil Torres, 67, Cuban shortstop and third baseman who played in 346 games for the Senators (1940 and 1944–1946).
January 23 – Cookie Cuccurullo, 64, left-handed pitcher who hurled in 62 total games for the wartime Pittsburgh Pirates (1943–1945).
January 23 – Phil Piton, 80, president of the Minor League Baseball from 1964 through 1971.
January 26 – Chet Laabs, 70, All-Star outfielder for the St. Louis Browns who hit two home runs in 1944's final game to clinch the Browns' only American League pennant; his 11-season (1937–1947) career also included service with the Detroit Tigers and Philadelphia Athletics.
January 26 – Del Rice, 60, catcher who appeared in 1,309 games over 17 MLB seasons (1945–1961) for five clubs, principally the St. Louis Cardinals and Milwaukee Braves; two-time (1946, 1957) World Series champion and 1953 All-Star; coach for Los Angeles/California Angels (1962–1966) who managed 1972 Angels to a 75–80 record.
January 28 – Joe Chamberlain, 72, infielder and pinch hitter who got into 41 games for the 1934 Chicago White Sox.
January 31 – Sam Gibson, 83, pitcher who worked in 131 career games for the Detroit Tigers (1926–1928), New York Yankees (1930) and New York Giants (1932).

February
February 3 – Trader Horne, 83, relief pitcher for the 1929 Chicago Cubs.
February 6 – Mal Moss, 77, left-handed pitcher who worked in 12 games for 1930 Cubs.
February 8 – Rufe Clarke, 82, pitcher who worked seven games, all in relief, for the 1923–1924 Detroit Tigers.
February 9 – Jackie Hayes, 76, second baseman who played in 1,091 games in 14 seasons for the Washington Senators and Chicago White Sox from 1927 to 1940.
February 12 – Bob Saunders, 81, pitcher for the Kansas City Monarchs and Detroit Stars of the Negro National League in 1926.
February 16 – Melba Alspaugh, 58, All-American Girls Professional Baseball League outfielder.
February 16 – Everett Fagan, 65, pitched who compiled a 2–7 won–lost record (5.47 ERA) in 38 games for the Philadelphia Athletics (1943, 1946).
February 19 – Frank Colman, 64, outfielder who appeared in 271 career games for Pittsburgh Pirates (1942–1946) and New York Yankees (1946–1947); member of the Canadian Baseball Hall of Fame.
February 26 – Ford Smith, 64, pitcher in 26 games (14–6, 2.29 ERA) and position player/pinch hitter in 33 more (.221 with 32 hits) for the Kansas City Monarchs of the Negro American League (1941, 1946–1948).

March
March 3 – Jennings Poindexter, 72, pitcher for the Red Sox and Cardinals in the 1930s.
March 4 – Kiddo Davis, 81, outfielder who appeared in 575 games over eight seasons (1926 and 1932–1938) for five clubs, principally the New York Giants and Philadelphia Phillies; batted .368 with seven hits, helping Giants win 1933 World Series.
March 10 – Connie Desmond, 75, play-by-play broadcaster for the New York Yankees and Giants (1942) and Brooklyn Dodgers (1943–1956).
March 12 – Bob Hall, 59, pitcher for the Boston Braves (1949–1950) and Pittsburgh Pirates (1953).
March 13 – Bill Anderson, 87, southpaw relief pitcher who got into two games for the Boston Braves in September 1925.
March 16 – Eudie Napier, 70, catcher for the Homestead Grays between 1939 and 1948, beginning as a backup to Josh Gibson before becoming a regular; member, 1948 Negro World Series champions.
March 18 – Frank Oceak, 70, longtime minor-league infielder and manager who spent 11 years in MLB as a coach for the Pittsburgh Pirates (1958–1964 and 1970–1972) and Cincinnati Reds (1965); third-base coach of 1960 and 1971 World Series champions.
March 20 – Ed Stone, 73, outfielder in the Negro Leagues who was known for his solid fielding and heavy bat.
March 24 – George Darrow, 79, left-hander who pitched in 17 games for the 1934 Philadelphia Phillies.
March 30 – Joe Cicero, 72, shortstop who played for the 1929–1930 Boston Red Sox as a teenager, disappeared into the minor leagues for over a decade, then returned to the majors at age 34 for the 1945 Philadelphia Athletics during the World War II manpower shortage.
March 30 – Jack Roche, 92, who appeared in 59 games as a catcher and pinch hitter for the St. Louis Cardinals (1914–1915, 1917).

April
April 1 – Calvin Chapman, 72, outfielder, second baseman and shortstop who appeared in 111 games for the 1934–1935 Cincinnati Reds.
April 3 – Mickey Livingston, 68, catcher who played in 561 career games over ten seasons between 1938 and 1951 for six MLB clubs; batted .364 in 22 at bats with four RBI in a losing cause as a Chicago Cub during the 1945 World Series. 
April 9 – Jake Freeze, 82, pitcher who appeared in two July 1925 games for the White Sox.
April 9 – Bill Kennedy, 62, southpaw pitcher for the Cleveland Indians, St. Louis Browns, Chicago White Sox, Boston Red Sox and Cincinnati Redlegs over eight seasons between from 1948 and 1957.
April 10 – Chet Johnson, 65, left-handed pitcher who appeared in 586 games during an 18-year minor-league career, but only five contests for 1946 St. Louis Browns; brother of fellow southpaw pitcher Earl Johnson.
April 11 – Mike Menosky, 88, outfielder for the Pittsburgh Rebels (of the "outlaw" Federal League), Washington Senators and Boston Red Sox between 1914 and 1923.
April 12 – Carl Morton, 39, pitcher with the Montréal Expos (1969–1972) and Atlanta Braves (1973–1976); 1970 National League Rookie of the Year after winning 18 games for second-year Expos club; also had seasons of 15, 16 and 17 wins for Braves.
April 15 – Bill Sarni, 55, catcher for the St. Louis Cardinals (1951–1952, 1954–1956) and New York Giants (1956) who appeared in 390 big-league games before suffering a heart attack at age 29 that ended his playing career.
April 17 – Emil "Dutch" Leonard, 74, five-time All-Star pitcher who employed the knuckleball in earning 191 wins over 20 seasons between 1933 and 1953 with the Brooklyn Dodgers, Washington Senators, Philadelphia Phillies and Chicago Cubs; one of four flutter-ball artists who were regular starting pitchers for the 1945 Senators.
April 18 – Woody Rich, 77, left-handed pitcher who worked in 33 career games for 1939–1941 Boston Red Sox and 1944 Boston Braves; won 249 games over 22 minor-league seasons.
April 22 – Mike Schemer, 65, first baseman who played 32 games for 1945–1946 New York Giants.
April 25 – Carlos Paula, 55, Cuban outfielder, first black player in Washington Senators history (September 6, 1954); batted .271 in 157 games over all or part of three seasons through June 1956.

May
May 2 – Dewitt Owens, 82, shortstop/second baseman for the Cleveland Elites and Birmingham Black Barons of the Negro National League from 1926 to 1930.
May 2 – Archie Yelle, 90, catcher who got into 87 games for the 1917–1919 Detroit Tigers.
May 6 – Nelson Greene, 83, southpaw pitcher who worked in 15 games for 1924–1925 Brooklyn Robins.
May 13 – Lerton Pinto, 84, left-hander who pitched in 12 games for the 1922 and 1924 Philadelphia Phillies.
May 16 – Mel Wright, 55, relief pitcher in 58 career games for St. Louis Cardinals (1954–1955) and Chicago Cubs (1960–1961), then a coach for five MLB clubs for 13 seasons between 1962 and 1983; member of Montreal Expos' staff at the time of his death.
May 20 – Fred Schulte, 82, center fielder for St. Louis Browns, Washington Senators and Pittsburgh Pirates from 1927 to 1937 who batted .291 in 1,179 games.
May 24 – Oscar Levis, 84, Jamaican-born pitcher for the Cuban Stars East of the Eastern Colored League (1923–1928); also played for the Hilldale Club and in the Cuban League.
May 26 – Dutch Romberger, 56, who pitched for 13 pro seasons (1948–1959, 1961), all of them in the Athletics' organization, but spent only ten games in MLB on the staff of the 1954 A's during their final season in Philadelphia.
May 30 – Harry Weaver, 91, pitcher who appeared in 19 games for the Philadelphia Athletics (1915–1916) and Chicago Cubs (1917–1919).

June
June 2 – Chancelor Edwards, 82, catcher who appeared in ten games for the Cleveland Tigers of the Negro National League in 1928.
June 10 – Jim Cronin, 77, infielder who appeared in 23 games for the 1929 World Series champion Philadelphia Athletics.
June 11 – Dick Aylward, 58, catcher and 14-year minor league veteran who played in four MLB games in May 1953 for the Chicago Cubs.
June 14 – Speed Martin, 89, pitcher who compiled a 29–42 won–lost mark and an ERA of 3.78 in 126 career games for the St. Louis Browns (1917) and Chicago Cubs (1918–1922)
June 20 – Gil Britton, 91, shortstop who appeared in three games for the Pittsburgh Pirates in September 1913.
June 21 – Kit Carson, 70, outfielder who played in 21 games for the 1934–1935 Cleveland Indians.
June 23 – Jimmy Newberry, 64, pitcher in 41 games in the Negro American League between 1943 and 1948, and one of the first two African-Americans to play in Nippon Professional Baseball.
June 26 – Don Rader, 89, a shortstop who appeared in nine career games as a member of the 1913 Chicago White Sox and 1921 Philadelphia Phillies.
June 27 – Doc Carroll, 91, catcher and dentistry school graduate who played in ten games for the hapless 1916 Philadelphia Athletics.
June 27 – Jesse Landrum, 70, second baseman who appeared in four games for the Chicago White Sox during the early weeks of the 1938 season; later, a longtime scout.

July
July 7 – Vic Wertz, 58, All-Star right fielder and first baseman for five AL teams over 17 years (1947–1963) who had five 100-RBI seasons, but was best remembered for his long fly ball caught spectacularly by Willie Mays in Game 1 of the 1954 World Series.
July 19 – Joe Beggs, 72, pitcher who led National League in saves in 1940 as standout reliever for the World Series champion Cincinnati Reds; also hurled for New York Yankees and New York Giants during his nine-year (1938, 1940–1944, 1946–1948) MLB career.
July 19 – George Sweatt, 89, outfielder/infielder who played in 343 Negro National League games for the Kansas City Monarchs (1922–1925) and Chicago American Giants (1926–1927).
July 20 – Chick Sorrells, 86, appeared in two games for the 1922 Cleveland Indians as a pinch hitter and shortstop.
July 23 – Neil Robinson, 75, nine-time All-Star as a stalwart of the Memphis Red Sox of the Negro American League between 1938 and 1948, primarily playing as a center fielder.

August
August 4 – Ed Wheeler, 68, infielder who appeared in 46 games for the Cleveland Indians during the wartime 1945 season.
August 6 – Tip Tobin, 76, outfielder who played one game (with one at bat) for the New York Giants on September 22, 1932.
August 6 – Jimmy Wasdell, 69, outfielder/first baseman who appeared in 888 games for five MLB teams over 11 seasons (1937–1947).
August 13 – Charlie Gilbert, 64, outfielder for three NL clubs over six seasons (1940–1943 and 1946–1947); son and brother of big leaguers.
August 16 – Earl Averill, 81, Hall of Fame center fielder for the Cleveland Indians who batted .318 lifetime and had five 100-RBI seasons; his line drive off Dizzy Dean's foot in the 1937 All-Star game led to the end of Dean's career; his son had a seven-year MLB career in 1950s and 1960s.
August 29 – Francis "Steve" O'Neill, 83, Cleveland trucking industry magnate who was principal owner of the Indians from 1978 until his death; prior to that, a limited partner in George Steinbrenner's New York Yankees ownership group from 1973 to 1978.

September
September 5 – Sam Woods, right-hander who pitched in five games in the Negro American League during the 1946 and 1948 seasons.
September 11 – Bill McCarren, 87, third baseman who appeared in 69 games for the 1923 Brooklyn Robins; longtime scout after his playing days.
September 28 – Walter Thomas, 71, outfielder/pitcher who played in the Negro leagues between 1935 and 1946; brother of Orrel Thomas and great-uncle of Richie Martin.

October
October 5 – George Turbeville, 69, left-hander who posted a 2–12 won–lost mark and an ERA of 6.14 in 62 career games for 1935–1937 Philadelphia Athletics.
October 12 – Charlie Engle, 80, infielder who played in 87 games for the Philadelphia Athletics (1925–1926) and Pittsburgh Pirates (1930).
October 18 – Willie "Puddin' Head" Jones, 58, "Whiz Kid" and All-Star third baseman for the Philadelphia Phillies (1947–1959), who led the National League in fielding percentage five times and in putouts seven times.
October 23 – Buck Crouse, 86, lefty-swinging backup catcher who appeared in 470 games over eight years (1923–1930) with Chicago White Sox.
October 28 – Ray Sanders, 66, first baseman for St. Louis Cardinals (1942–1945) and Boston Braves (1946 and 1948–1949); member of 1942 and 1944 world champion Redbirds, and 1943 and 1948 NL champs in St. Louis and Boston respectively.
October 31 – George Halas, 88, outfielder who played in 12 games for the 1919 New York Yankees before becoming a legend in the National Football League.

November
November 1 – Art Ruble, 80, outfielder who appeared in 75 MLB games as a member of the 1927 Detroit Tigers and 1934 Philadelphia Phillies. 
November 2 – Hal Wiltse, 80, pitcher for the Boston Red Sox (1926–28), St. Louis Browns (1928) and Philadelphia Phillies (1931).
November 4 – Clarence Pickrel, 72, pitcher who appeared in 19 total games for the 1933 Phillies and 1934 Boston Braves.
November 6 – Bob Lawrence, 83, pitcher who appeared in one game and pitched one inning as a member of the Chicago White Sox on July 19, 1924.
November 15 – Charlie Grimm, known as "Jolly Cholly," 85, good-natured first baseman (1925–1936) and manager (all or parts of 14 years over three terms between 1932 and 1960) of the Chicago Cubs who batted .300 five times and led the Cubs to three National League pennants (1932, 1935 and 1945); also played for Philadelphia Athletics, St. Louis Cardinals and Pittsburgh Pirates, and managed Boston/Milwaukee Braves; in addition, served Cubs as a coach, broadcaster and front-office executive.
November 18 – Hilton Smith, 76, pitcher for the Negro leagues' Kansas City Monarchs who was known for his outstanding curveball and was inducted into the Baseball Hall of Fame posthumously in 2001.
November 22 – Dave Short, 66, outfielder who played seven games for Chicago White Sox in 1940 and 1941.
November 24 – Ed Leip, 72, second baseman and pinch runner in 30 career games for the Washington Senators and Pittsburgh Pirates between 1939 and 1942.
November 28 – Chet Boak, 48, who appeared in ten games as a pinch hitter and second baseman—five for the 1960 Kansas City Athletics and five for the 1961 expansion Washington Senators.
November 30 – Bill Evans, 69, relief pitcher for the Chicago White Sox and Boston Red Sox between 1949 and 1951.

December
December 2 – Mike Powers, 77, pinch hitter and right fielder for 1932–1933 Cleveland Indians, appearing in 38 total games.
December 12 – Jim Weaver, 80, known as "Big James",  pitcher who appeared in 189 games over eight seasons for six MLB clubs, chiefly the Pirates, between 1928 and 1939; led NL in shutouts (4) in 1935.
December 14 – Roy Hamey, 81, longtime executive; general manager of the Pittsburgh Pirates, Philadelphia Phillies and New York Yankees for 12 seasons between 1947 and 1963; won three pennants and two World Series titles in his three seasons (1961–1963) as head of the Yankees' front office.
December 19 – Zip Collins, 91, outfielder who played 281 games for the Pirates (1914–1915), Boston Braves (1915–1917) and Philadelphia Athletics (1921).
December 25 – Babe Young, 68, first baseman who appeared in 728 games for the New York Giants (1936, 1939–1942 and 1946–1947), Cincinnati Reds (1947–1948) and St. Louis Cardinals (1948); twice topped 100-RBI mark.
December 29 – Bob Neal, 77, Cleveland play-by-play announcer who called Indians' games on radio or television for 18 seasons spanning 1952 to 1972.

References